Koji Akiyama (秋山 幸二 Akiyama Kōji, born April 6, 1962) is a retired Japanese professional baseball player. He played for the Seibu Lions and the Fukuoka Daiei Hawks (currently the Fukuoka SoftBank Hawks) in Japan's Nippon Professional Baseball (NPB).

A speedy slugger, Akiyama accumulated more than 400 career home runs and 300 career stolen bases, a feat matched only by one other NPB player in history (Isao Harimoto). Akiyama was an integral part of the "Invincible Seibu" during the 1980s and 1990s, named such due to their sustained domination of the league, winning 11 league championships and eight Japan Series championships between 1982–1994. (Akiyama left Seibu after the 1993 season.) On July 13, 1989, Akiyama hit for the cycle.

Akiayma was a Best Nine Award-winner eight times, a Golden Glove winner 11 times (1987–1996, 1999), and appeared in 18 consecutive Nippon Professional Baseball All-Star Series (1985–2002), an NPB record. In addition, Akiyama was Japan Series MVP twice (1991 and 1999), and a Matsutaro Shoriki Award-winner three times (1991, 2011, and 2014). (He also struck out 1,712 times, third on the all-time list.) Akiyama was elected to the Japanese Baseball Hall of Fame in 2014. He is also a member of Meikyukai (the Golden Players Club).

He replaced Sadaharu Oh on October 8, 2008 as manager of the Hawks, serving as the team's manager through 2014.

Career statistics

※Bolded figures are league leading

Titles and accomplishments
Home Run Champion : once (1987)
Stolen Bases Champion : once (1990)
Decisive RBIs Champion : 4 times (1985,1987)

See also 
 List of top Nippon Professional Baseball home run hitters

References

External links

1962 births
Baseball people from Kumamoto Prefecture
Fukuoka SoftBank Hawks managers
Fukuoka Daiei Hawks players
Japanese Baseball Hall of Fame inductees
Japanese expatriate baseball players in the United States
Living people
Managers of baseball teams in Japan
Nippon Professional Baseball outfielders
San Jose Bees players
Seibu Lions players